During the 1997–98 English football season, Oxford United F.C. competed in the Football League First Division.

Season summary
In the 1997–98 season, Denis Smith resigned in December with the club £10 million in debt and was replaced in January by Malcolm Shotton. His appointment was popular and initially successful, as he led the team out of relegation danger to a creditable 12th-place finish in Division One.

Final league table

Results
Oxford United's score comes first

Legend

Football League First Division

FA Cup

League Cup

Squad

References

Oxford United F.C. seasons
Oxford United